Nightbloom (2010) is the collaborative album by ambient musicians Steve Roach and Mark Seelig, containing Mark's vocal and Tuva-style overtoning, combining Steve's zones and grooves. The disc features five seamless parts, single-track composition.

Songs 
The first track features a slow rising and falling bass tone for the first eight minutes until a subtle percussion pattern begins to emerge slowly from deep in the mix. The second track brings a drumming loop, further laden with echo as the main drones continue steadily. The third track subtly the drones and the drums with a slow martial summoning, as does the fourth track. The final track strips away the drumming for the first part because a final, helping to sum up and send out the album on a strong note.

Reception 
AllMusic rated the album a 3.5 of 5, saying "it's enjoyable more than remarkable, but Roach and Seelig are nothing if not listenable composers for a variety of moods".

Hypnagogue highly rated the album, saying "Nightbloom has taken me to amazing places and shown me incredible things every time I’ve listened".

Track listing

Personnel 
Adapted from Discogs
 Sam Rosenthal – artwork, design
 Steve Roach – drone, electronics
 Mark Seelig – overtone voice
 Steve Roach – photography
 Dawn Wilson-Enoch – photography
 Steve Roach – recorder, mixing, arranger
 Beate Maria – tambura

References

External links 
 Nightbloom at Bandcamp
 Nightbloom at Discogs

2010 albums
Steve Roach (musician) albums
Projekt Records albums